The 2021 Sudirman Cup (officially known as the  TotalEnergies BWF Sudirman Cup Finals 2021 for sponsorship reasons) was the 17th edition of the Sudirman Cup, the biennial international badminton championship contested by the mixed national teams of the member associations of Badminton World Federation (BWF), since its inception in 1989. The tournament was played in Vantaa, Finland, between 26 September and 3 October 2021. China were the defending champions. They successfully defended their title, lifting the trophy for a record-extending 12th time.

Host city selection
Originally the Badminton World Federation awarded Suzhou, China to host the tournament back in November 2018, but due to the strict restrictions from the ongoing COVID-19 pandemic, it was too hard to conduct tournaments in China in 2021. Thus, on 29 June 2021 BWF announced that Vantaa, Finland would be the new host to stage this tournament.

Competition format
Compare to the format used previously, this time a new format will be used. 16 teams will be contested instead of 32, they will play in four groups of four teams. As usual the competition starts with a group stage followed by a knockout stage.

Qualifying
Originally, the qualifying process to qualify was through each continental (Asia, Europe, Pan America, Africa, and Oceania) mixed team championships which were planned to take place around February 2021. However, only the European Mixed Team Championships was able to take place due to travel and border restrictions arising from the ongoing COVID-19 pandemic affecting the other planned continental team championships. Therefore, teams from Asia, Pan America, Oceania, and Africa qualified based on the World Rankings.

With the move of hosts from Suzhou, China to Vantaa, Finland it was decided to retain the same qualifying teams as originally qualified in February for the Suzhou hosted tournament which means the quota place for the hosts is temporarily waived. However, if a team withdrew from the competition, the host (Finland) will be invited to participate first.

France and Australia, later on, withdrew from the competition, thus Finland was awarded a quota place as the host. New Zealand was originally to take the place but also declined, in the end, Tahiti was awarded the quota place for Oceania due to their performance at the 2019 Pacific Games.

Seeding

Tiebreakers
The rankings of teams in each group were determined per BWF Statutes Section 5.1, Article 16.3: 
Number of ties won;
Tie result between the teams in question;
Match difference in all group ties;
Game difference in all group ties;
Point difference in all group ties.

Squads

Group stage

All times are Eastern European Summer Time (UTC+3)

Group A

Group B

Group C

Group D

Knockout stage

Bracket

Quarter-finals

Semi-finals

Final

Final ranking

References

Sudirman Cup
2021 Sudirman Cup
2021 in badminton
Sudirman Cup
Sudirman Cup
Sudirman Cup
Sudirman Cup